Roy Stephenson (27 May 1932 – 4 February 2000) was an English professional footballer. During his career he made 144 appearances for Ipswich Town between 1960 and 1965. He was born in Crook.

Honours
Ipswich Town
Football League First Division: 1961–62
Football League Second Division: 1960–61

Individual
Ipswich Town Hall of Fame: Inducted 2010

References

External links 
Roy Stephenson at Pride of Anglia
Rotherham United official website

1932 births
2000 deaths
People from Crook, County Durham
Footballers from County Durham
English footballers
Association football wingers
Burnley F.C. players
Ipswich Town F.C. players
Rotherham United F.C. players
Blackburn Rovers F.C. players
Leicester City F.C. players
English Football League players